Perumal Tirumoli is a compilation of hymns written by Kulasekhara Alvar, one of the Alvars, the poet-saints of the Sri Vaishnava tradition. This work, which is a part of the Naalayira Divya Prabandham, consists of 105 hymns, that are numbered 647 to 750 in the compendium. It is dedicated to the worship of Vishnu, who is often referred to as Perumal.

Hymns 
The Perumal Tirumoli notably contain five decads on the holy town of Srirangam, and five each on Rama and Krishna, the latter considered to be of great poetic merit.

The first pasuram, or hymn, of this work is as follows:

See also 

 Periyalvar Tirumoli
 Nachiyar Tirumoli
 Tiruviruttam

References

External links 
 My Sapphire-hued Lord, My Beloved. A Complete, Annotated Translation of Kulacēkara Āḻvār’s Perumāḷ Tirumoḻi and Periyavāccāṉ Piḷḷai’s Medieval Maṇipravāḷam Commentary, with an Introduction - Suganya

Naalayira Divya Prabandham
Tamil Hindu literature
Vaishnava texts